This is a '''list of universities in Gabon.

Universities in Gabon
Université Omar Bongo

References

External links
Universities in Gabon

Gabon
Gabon
Universities